Bonka Pindzheva (born October 12, 1970) is a Bulgarian sprint canoer who competed from the early 1990s to the mid-2000s (decade). She won two medals at the ICF Canoe Sprint World Championships with a silver (K-2 500 m: 2003) and a bronze (K-2 200 m: 2002).

Pindzheva also competed in three Summer Olympics, earning her best finish of sixth in the K-2 500 m event at Athens in 2004.

References

Sports-reference.com profile

1970 births
Bulgarian female canoeists
Canoeists at the 1992 Summer Olympics
Canoeists at the 1996 Summer Olympics
Canoeists at the 2004 Summer Olympics
Living people
Olympic canoeists of Bulgaria
ICF Canoe Sprint World Championships medalists in kayak